The 1943–44 Nationalliga A season was the sixth season of the Nationalliga A, the top level of ice hockey in Switzerland. Seven teams participated in the league, and HC Davos won the championship.

Standings

External links
 Championnat de Suisse 1943/44

Swiss
National League (ice hockey) seasons
1943–44 in Swiss ice hockey